Overcome may refer to:

 Overcome (Alexandra Burke album), 2009
 Overcome (All That Remains album), 2008
 "Overcome" (Creed song), 2009
 "Overcome" (Live song), 2001
 "overcome" (Tricky song)
 "Overcome", a song by Jeremy Camp from We Cry Out: The Worship Project
 "Overcome", a song by Stephanie McIntosh from Tightrope
 "Overcome", a song by Wayne Marshall from the compilation album Diwali Riddim
 Overcome (band), an American metalcore band